Hilarius (floruit 408) was a politician of the Western Roman Empire.

Hilarius is known to be the praefectus urbi of Rome in 408. He is attested in office on January 15 of that year by a law preserved in the Codex Theodosianus. He has been sometimes identified with a Hilarius Praetorian prefect of Gaul in 396, but this identification is rejected by historians on the fact that the urban prefecture was a lesser office than the praetorian one.

Bibliography 
 Arnold Hugh Martin Jones, John Robert Martindale, J. Morris, "Hilarius 2", The Prosopography of the Later Roman Empire, Cambridge University Press, 1971, p. 563.

5th-century Romans
Urban prefects of Rome